Potos is a village on the island of Thasos in northern Greece. The village is located in the south of the island, on the coast of the Thracian Sea (the northernmost part of the Aegean Sea) with a population of 815 residents (as of 2011). The seaside village is a popular tourist resort in the July-August Summer season, where tourism provides a large proportion of the income, alongside fishing and marble exploitation.

References

External links
 Official municipality website

Populated places in Thasos